Brian Laurence Bennett,  (born 9 February 1940) is an English drummer, pianist, composer and producer of popular music. He is best known as the drummer of the UK rock and roll group the Shadows. He is the father of musician and Shadows band member Warren Bennett.

Biography
Bennett was born in Palmers Green, North London, England. Educated at Hazlewood Lane School, Palmers Green, London and Winchmore Council School, he finished school at the age of sixteen to play drums in a Ramsgate skiffle group performing for holiday makers. After returning to London he became the in-house drummer at The 2i's Coffee Bar in Soho and was a regular performer on Jack Good's TV show Oh Boy!

He then became a member of Marty Wilde's Wildcats in 1959. After a successful period with the Wildcats, during which he appeared on their instrumental record without Wilde (recorded as the Krew Kats), "Trambone", he backed Tommy Steele for some of his London stage performances, and then in October 1961 he joined Cliff Richard and the Shadows as the replacement for Tony Meehan.

In 1967, Bennett released a solo album of jazz music, entitled Change of Direction, in mono and stereo (neither charted). This was the first solo album by a member of the Shadows. In the 1970s, music by Bennett was selected for several Radley Metzger films, including Barbara Broadcast and The Opening of Misty Beethoven.

He stayed with the group throughout all of their subsequent line-ups, and in May 2005 took part in the Shadows' European tour. During a show in Reykjavík, Iceland he sustained what was thought to be a minor injury to a finger. A splinter from a drumstick pierced under his fingernail on his right hand, he removed it with a pair of old pliers and applied a plaster. A few days later after arriving in Paris, France he was in so much pain he called a doctor. The doctor diagnosed a bad infection and recommended Bennett go to hospital immediately. Thinking it would be a short visit he attended only to find out that it would involve a minor, but very painful, operation to remove the poison. He was due to be playing on stage that evening and had already missed the soundcheck. He arrived at the theatre 15 minutes before the show with his right-hand bandaged and still numb from the anaesthetic. He managed to play for the whole show using an altered playing style.

In addition to his work with the Shadows he has also appeared in Cliff Richard's backing band and plays piano and occasionally vibraphone.

Bennett has enjoyed a parallel and successful career as a composer of library music, issuing multiple LPs with production music labels such as Bruton and KPM. This has resulted in the use of his music for many popular TV theme tunes including BBC sports themes such as Rugby Special ("Holy Mackerel") and BBC Golf ("Chase Side Shoot Up"), Channel 9 Australia's cricket theme and police drama Bluey theme tune ("New Horizons"), the sitcoms Robin's Nest and Birds of a Feather, The Ruth Rendell Mysteries, Pulaski, Square Deal, Close to Home, Murder in Mind and, with his son Warren, composed and played the incidental music in New Tricks. Two of his most famous works were "The Journey" and "Just a Minute" written under the alias James Aldenham and used for the ITV Schools on 4 broadcasts between 1987 and 1993. He scored the British-German film The Harpist in 1999.

He is also an orchestral conductor, having learned how to arrange and conduct music for orchestras from a correspondence course. His son Warren Bennett formerly played keyboards for the band Glass Ties, and is also a composer and producer.

Honours 
He was appointed OBE (Officer of the Order of the British Empire) in the 2004 Queen's Birthday Honours List for services to music.

Bennett runs a home recording studio, Honeyhill studios, in Radlett, Hertfordshire. In November 2009, at the age of 69, Bennett completed a 50th Anniversary reunion world tour with Cliff Richard and the Shadows.

Discography

Albums
Brian Bennett – Change of Direction – LP/CD – Columbia/see4Miles
Brian Bennett – Illustrated London Noise – LP/CD – Columbia/see4Miles – 1969
Collage – Misty – – LP/CD – DJM/see4Miles
Brian Bennett Band – Rock Dreams  – LP/CD – DJM/see4Miles – 1977
Brian Bennett Band – Voyage (A Journey into Discoid Funk) – LP/CD – DJM/see4Miles – 1978
Heat Exchange – One step ahead – LP/CD – EMI/see4Miles
Ruth Rendell Mysteries – LP/CD
Ruth Rendell Mysteries (volume.2) – LP/CD
Ruth Rendell Mysteries (Wexford) – LP/CD
Drumtrax (house library. ) – CD
Nomads of the wind – CD
Global sunrise – CD.
The Works – (Box set of 4CDs).
Greatest Guitar hits (volume 1) – CD
Greatest Guitar hits (volume 2) – CD
Living Britain – CD
Official Bootleg album – CD

Singles
Canvas/Slippery Jim De Grize – 7" – DB 8294 – Columbia.
Ridin The Gravy Train/Bubble Drum (Thunder company) – 7" – DB 8706
Chase side shoot up/Pegasus – 7" – 6007040
Thunderbolt/Clearing skies – 7" – DJS10714
Saturday night special/Farewell to a friend – 7" – DJS10756
Girls back home/Jonty Jump – 7" – DJS10791
Pendulum force/Ocean Glide – 7" – DJS10843
Top of the world/ Soul Ice – 7" – DJM10981
Shake down/Your gonna love this – 7" – EMI 2988
Shake down/Your Gonna Love this – 12" – 12EMI2988

Music labels (non-commercial)
Themes Records – LP
KPM – solo & w/others – LP
Bruton – solo & w/others – LP/CD
Music House – solo & w/others – CD
Reliable Source Music – CD

Filmography
Luxo Jr. – music: "Chateau Latour", "Finesse", "Quicksilver"
Light & Heavy – music: "Chateau Latour"
Surprise – music: "Quicksilver"

Production credits
Dennis Waterman – Downwind of Angels – LP – DJF 204830 – DJM – 1976
Dennis Waterman – Dennis Waterman – LP – DJF 20513 – DJM – 1977
Demis Roussos – The Demis Roussos Magic – (CD) – BX 523-2
Drake – "Summer Sixteen" – 2016

References

External links
 
 
 

English drummers
British male drummers
English pianists
English record producers
English rock drummers
English composers
British rock and roll musicians
People from Palmers Green
1940 births
Living people
Officers of the Order of the British Empire
Ivor Novello Award winners
People from Radlett
The Shadows members
English conductors (music)
British male conductors (music)
British music arrangers
People educated at Winchmore School
British male pianists
21st-century British conductors (music)